Crazy Horse Memorial Highway is the name given to two highways named in honor of Crazy Horse (circa 1850–1877), a Lakota war leader:

A portion of U.S. Route 16/U.S. Route 385 in South Dakota
A portion of U.S. Route 20 in Nebraska

U.S. Highways in South Dakota
U.S. Highways in Nebraska
Monuments and memorials in South Dakota
Monuments and memorials in Nebraska